is the third and last solo single of ANZA. It was released on August 2, 2006 under Universal Music Japan. This single didn't chart on the Oricon. The song was used as a 2nd ending theme for the anime Glass Fleet.

Track list

References 

Anime songs
Anime music
2006 singles
2006 songs
Gonzo (company)
Satelight
Universal Music Japan singles